Robert Charles Page, DSO (21 July 1920 – 7 July 1945) was an Australian soldier who was a member of Z Special Unit during the Second World War. He took part in Operation Jaywick and Operation Rimau, in which he was captured and executed by the Japanese. He was the nephew of Australian prime minister Sir Earle Page, and the son of Harold Page, who died as a Japanese prisoner of war in 1942. Page was played by John Howard in the film The Highest Honor (1983) and Chris Morsley in The Heroes (1989) and Heroes II: The Return (1991).

References

1920 births
1945 deaths
Australian Army officers
Australian Army personnel of World War II
Australian military personnel killed in World War II
Australian people of English descent
Australian prisoners of war
Companions of the Distinguished Service Order
People educated at Sydney Boys High School
People executed by Japan by decapitation
World War II prisoners of war held by Japan
Capital punishment in Singapore